Secret Path or Secret Paths may refer to:

Books
The Secret Path, book by Paul Brunton Sri Ramana Ashram
The Secret Paths of Divine Love, work by mystic Constantine Barbanson (1581–1632) abridged by George Anselm Touchet (died 1689) 
Secret Path, graphic novel by Gord Downie and Jeff Lemire

Film, TV and video games
Secret Paths (Κρυφά μονοπάτια Κryfa Monopatia)  Greek TV series 2005–2006 with Anthimos Ananiadis, List of programs broadcast by ANT1
Secret Paths, film by Michael Papas 2013
Chasing Secrets, or The Secret Path, TV film with Della Reese, Ossie Davis Aimée Castle Crystal Bernard William Greenblatt Yvonne Zima  (1999)
The Secret Path, UK film List of LGBT-related films (2014) 
El Camino Secreto The Secret Path, telenovela 1986
"The Secret Path" (Part 1) October 26, 2013 List of Spooksville episodes
Secret Paths (video game), a 1997 interactive novel developed by Purple Moon

Music
Secret Path, album by Gord Downie
Secret Paths (album), by Dave Cousins

See also
The Mysterious Cities of Gold: Secret Paths game developed by Neko Entertainment

Other
The Secret Path, in the Russell-Cotes Art Gallery & Museum by Mariquita Jenny Moberly